Sai Mun may refer to:

Sai Mun District, a district (amphoe) in Yasothon Province, Thailand
Sai Mun Subdistrict Sai Mun District
Sai Mun Subdistrict in Nam Phong District, Khon Kaen, Thailand
Sai Mun, Chiang Mai, a subdistrict (tambon) in San Kamphaeng District, Chiang Mai, Thailand
Sai Mun Subdistrict in Ongkharak District, Nakhon Nayok, Thailand
Sai Mun Subdistrict in Sawang Daen Din District, Sakon Nakhon, Thailand
Sai Mun Subdistrict in Phibun Mangsahan District, Ubon Ratchathani, Thailand